The Menasco Unitwin 2-544 was a coupled piston engine.
Menasco Motors Company of Burbank, California was a well known manufacturer of inverted inline four and six cylinder engines. At the request of Lockheed Aircraft designers, Menasco produced an inverted twelve-cylinder air cooled aircraft engine by designing a common crankcase and gearbox for two of the six cylinder engines. The two crankshafts were combined with a unique double clutch gearbox to power a single propeller. This gave reliability of a twin engine aircraft in a single powerplant. It was a success, but did not enter production as no aircraft were produced that used it.

Design and development
In mid-1935 Lockheed's chief engineer, Hall Hibbard, began discussing with Al Menasco, the president of the Menasco Motors Company in Burbank, the merits of coupling two Menasco C6S Super Buccaneer  six-cylinder in-line engines mounted side-by-side, driving a single propeller.

In 1937 Lockheed established the AiRover Aircraft Company as a subsidiary to give Lockheed a place in the personal aviation market. Hall Hibbard wanted  AiRover to use Menasco's novel twin powerplant in its first aircraft. AirRover used components of  various Lockheed aircraft to construct what was designated as the Lockheed Altair 8G to serve as a flying test stand for the unproven Menasco engine. This test bed was first flown in December 1937 and confirmed the merits of its powerplant, leading to the decision to proceed with the design of a similarly-powered five-seat feeder-liner.

During 1938 the AiRover Company was reorganized as the Vega Aircraft Corporation, and with Mac V.F. Shortits installed as president, it  started the design the new feeder-liner. Jack Wassail was the project engineer, and the aircraft was soon under construction in Vega's new A-1 plant, located at the recently purchased Lockheed Air Terminal.

Operational history
The "Flying Testbed" was a custom built Vega Altair 8 (NX18149) used to test the experimental 520 hp Menasco Unitwin for use in the planned Starliner. The engine was two 260 hp Menasco C6S-4 Super Buccaneer engines mounted to a common gearbox that drove a single, two-blade, variable-pitch propeller. When it was no longer needed, the airplane was sold to  Howard Batt, a Lockheed dealer. It was reengined with a 450 hp Pratt & Whitney Wasp SC in 1939, and was then registered as a Lockheed Altair 8-D in 1940.

Starliner Model 2, registered NX21725, rolled out of the factory in the spring of 1939 as a low-wing cabin monoplane with twin vertical tail surfaces. Its tricycle undercarriage retracted aft, with the wheels partially protruding beneath the nose and wing.

The Starliner was the first totally new Vega Airplane Company aircraft.  It made its maiden flight at Burbank, California on April 22, 1939, with Vern Dorrell as pilot and J.B. Kendrick as engineering observer. The flight ended with an emergency when the propeller accidentally slipped into fine pitch. Vern Dorrell succeeded in landing on a vacant field, with minimum damage to the aircraft.

During repairs the twin tail was changed to a single vertical tail surface and an upgraded 640 hp Unitwin engine, the Starliner model 2 became the model 22 when it resumed its test flights. The Starliner was damaged again when Bud Martin had to land it on its main wheels when the nose wheel failed to come down. With the nose protected by the partially protruding front wheel, the aircraft again escaped with only slight damage to its lower cowling.

Repaired a second time, the Starliner satisfactorily completed a total of 85 flying hours; but due to its limited capacity of a pilot and four or five passengers, it was too small to satisfy the needs of the airlines. Menasco and Vega were increasingly occupied with military contracts. The only Starliner ended its life as a non-flying prop at a film studio.

Variants
The Unitwin was developed in at least three versions:

520 hp Unitwin
 Original version
600 hp Unitwin
 for the Starliner model 2
640 hp Unitwin
 for the Starliner model 22

None of  these engines survived

Applications
 Vega Altair 8G
 Vega Model 2 Starliner

Specifications (U 2-544)

See also

References

 Francillon, René J, Lockheed Aircraft since 1913. Naval Institute Press: Annapolis, 1987
 Peter & Rita Forbes' Engine Webpages
 aircraftone.com

Air-cooled aircraft piston engines
1930s aircraft piston engines
Inverted aircraft piston engines
Unitwin